San Lorenzo Island may refer to:

 San Lorenzo Island, Peru, the largest island of the country.
 San Lorenzo Island, Mexico, an island in the Gulf of California.